Óscar Arribas Pasero (born 22 October 1998) is a Filipino-Spanish professional footballer who plays as a winger for Malaysia Super League club Johor Darul Ta'zim.

Club career
Arribas was born in Parla, Community of Madrid, and joined AD Alcorcón's youth setup in 2014, from CDE Lugo Fuenlabrada. He made his first team debut on 29 November 2016, before even appearing with the reserves, coming on as a second half substitute for Samu in a 1–1 home draw against RCD Espanyol for the season's Copa del Rey.

Arribas made his debut with the B-side on 15 January 2017, in a 0–3 Tercera División home loss against Getafe CF B. His Segunda División debut came on 4 March, again from the bench in a 0–0 home draw against Sevilla Atlético.

On 16 August 2019, Arribas signed his first professional contract until 2021. He scored his first goal with the main squad on 12 October, netting the opener in a 3–1 away defeat of Sporting de Gijón.

On 1 July 2022, after Alkors relegation, Arribas signed a one-year contract with FC Cartagena in the second division. On 13 December, however, he terminated his link with the club.

International career
Being born in Spain, and having Filipino ancestry, Arribas is eligible to represent either Spain or Philippines at international level.

Philippines
In November 2022, it was reported that Arribas received a call-up from the Philippines for a training camp, in preparation for the 2022 AFF Championship.

Honours

Club
Johor Darul Ta'zim
 Malaysia Charity Shield: 2023

References

External links

1998 births
Living people
People from Parla
Footballers from the Community of Madrid
Spanish footballers
Association football midfielders
Association football wingers
AD Alcorcón footballers
AD Alcorcón B players
FC Cartagena footballers
Segunda División players
Tercera División players
Spanish people of Filipino descent
Spanish sportspeople of Asian descent